Los Espartanos is a Peruvian football club, located in the city of Pacasmayo, La Libertad. The club was founded with the name of club Los Espartanos de Pacasmayo.

History
The club was 1984 Copa Perú champion, when defeated Alianza Atlético, Deportivo Educación, Bella Esperanza, Guardia Republicana, and Universitario (Tacna) in the Final Stage.

The club have played at the highest level of Peruvian football on two occasions, from 1985 Torneo Descentralizado until 1986 Torneo Descentralizado when was relegated to the Copa Perú.

Honours

National
Copa Perú: 1
Winners (1): 1984

Regional
Liga Departamental de La Libertad:
Winners (1): 1983
Runner-up (1): 2005

Liga Provincial de Pacasmayo:
Winners (7): 1966, 1968, 1971, 1972, 1978, 1979, 1983

Liga Distrital de Pacasmayo:
Runner-up (1): 2016

See also
List of football clubs in Peru
Peruvian football league system

External links
 FPF - Campeones de la Copa Peru (Spanish)
 RSSSF - Peru - All-Time Table Descentralizado 1966-2008
 Campeonato Descentralizado 1985

Football clubs in Peru
Association football clubs established in 1924